Eilema plana, the little white lichen moth, is a moth of the subfamily Arctiinae. The species was first described by Jean Baptiste Boisduval in 1832. It is found in the Australian states of Queensland, New South Wales and Victoria.

The wingspan is about 30 mm. The wings are plain and can range in colour from white to pale brown.

References

Moths described in 1832
plana